In Greek mythology, Thrassa, was the daughter of Ares and Tereine, daughter of the river-god Strymon. Hipponous, son of Triballos (eponym or god of the Triballoi (Τριβαλλοί) tribe of Thrace), married her and they had a daughter called Polyphonte. This daughter scorned the activities of Aphrodite and went to the mountains as a companion and sharer of sports with Artemis. Thus, the goddess of love made her fall in love with a bear and drove her mad. Polyphonte eventually coupled with a bear and bore the ursine giants Agrius and Oreion.

Note

References 

 Antoninus Liberalis, The Metamorphoses of Antoninus Liberalis translated by Francis Celoria (Routledge 1992). Online version at the Topos Text Project.

Children of Ares
Women in Greek mythology